Harold Dallas Rogers (born December 31, 1937) is an American lawyer and politician serving his 22nd term as the U.S. representative for , having served since 1981. He is a member of the Republican Party. Upon Don Young's death in 2022, Rogers became the dean of the House of Representatives. Together with Chris Smith of New Jersey, he is one of the two remaining members of the House who first took office during the Carter Administration.

Early life and education

Rogers was born in Barrier, Kentucky. After attending Western Kentucky University in Bowling Green, he earned a Bachelor of Arts and Bachelor of Laws from the University of Kentucky. Rogers served in the Kentucky Army National Guard and North Carolina Army National Guard.

Early career 
As a lawyer Rogers was in private practice and was elected to serve as commonwealth's attorney for Pulaski and Rockcastle counties in Kentucky, an office he held from 1969 to his election to Congress in 1980.

Rogers was the Republican nominee for lieutenant governor of Kentucky in 1979. He was on the ballot with former Governor Louie B. Nunn. He lost to Democratic nominee John Y. Brown Jr. 59%-41%. The following year, Rogers won election to Congress.

U.S. House of Representatives

Elections

In 1980, incumbent Republican U.S. Congressman Tim Lee Carter of Kentucky's 5th congressional district decided to retire. Rogers won the Republican primary with a plurality of 23 percent. The losing candidates included the 1971 gubernatorial nominee, Tom Emberton. He won the general election with 67% of the vote. He has won reelection with at least 65% of the vote since then, except in 1992, when he defeated Democratic State Senator John Doug Hays 55%-45%.

Tenure

Rogers is the longest-serving Kentucky Republican ever elected to federal office. He represents one of the few ancestrally Republican districts south of the Ohio River. South-central Kentucky, historically the heart of the district, is very similar demographically to East Tennessee. Its voters identified with the Republicans after the Civil War and have supported the GOP ever since. Rogers served as a delegate to nine Republican National Conventions from 1976 to 2008.

The Center for Rural Development, a 501c(3) nonprofit organization established in Somerset, Kentucky, in March 1996, was Rogers's idea.

In 2001 the City of Williamsburg, Kentucky named their new water park and miniature golf facility the Hal Rogers Family Entertainment Center as a "thank-you for the federal money he has brought back to Whitley County, the City of Williamsburg, and the other 40 counties he represents".

On the House/Senate conference decision to bolster the Department of Commerce and support the Clinton Administration priorities, President Clinton remarked, "I commend the congressional leadership, Senator Ernest Hollings, Senator Pete Domenici, Congressman Neal Smith, and Congressman Harold Rogers, for their foresight and support in revitalizing this country through these programs. It is a dramatic step forward for the United States toward a solid economic future."

Kentucky state biographer Amy Witherbee commented: "Rogers's multiple roles on the Appropriations Committee have honed his skills as a bipartisan negotiator, and his economically challenged district often prompts him to stray from hard-line conservative stances. Although voting with his party against raising environmental standards on sports utility vehicles and against a controversial amendment that would have prohibited oil drilling in the Arctic National Wildlife Refuge, Rogers has been the creator and leading proponent of large environmental protection and clean-up programs throughout the Appalachian region.... [His] reluctance to involve the federal government in local issues has not deterred him from supporting a multitude of economic development programs aimed at creating new job bases in economically disadvantaged areas, and particularly in Appalachia. In 1993, Rogers was one of only three Republicans to vote for then-President Bill Clinton's economic stimulus package. In March 2003, Rogers's ability to work through the bipartisan tangles of the Appropriations Committee won him the chairmanship on the subcommittee designated to control funding for the new Department of Homeland Security."

Ready evidence is found on March 20, 2008, when the invitation to testify in support of environmental legislation by Democratic House Majority Leader Rocky Adkins, and, on the same day, a rare invitation to speak from the Senate floor was afforded by Republican Senate Majority Leader Senator David L. Williams of Cumberland County as part of the Senate's unanimously passed bipartisan resolution honoring Rogers for his service.

Rogers called a bill to reduce funding for law enforcement "the result of this new Republican majority's commitment to bring about real change in the way Washington spends the people's money".

In 2011 Rogers voted for the National Defense Authorization Act for Fiscal Year 2012, which included a controversial provision that allowed the government and the military to indefinitely detain American citizens and others without trial.

In December 2017 Rogers voted for the Tax Cuts and Jobs Act of 2017.

Rogers, along with all other Senate and House Republicans, voted against the American Rescue Plan Act of 2021.

Criticism

Rogers has been widely criticized by both liberal and conservative pundits for his priorities when it comes to national security. National Review called him "a national disgrace" and Rolling Stone named him one of America's "Ten Worst Congressmen", calling him "Bin Laden's Best Friend" for steering federal homeland security money away from large cities to his home district, which critics claim is one of the least likely terrorist targets in America because of its lack of any notable monuments or population centers. In 2007 Citizens for Responsibility and Ethics in Washington named Rogers to its list of the Most Corrupt Members of Congress.

On May 14, 2006, the New York Times reported that Rogers had used his legislative position, as chairman of the House subcommittee that controls the Homeland Security budget, to create "jobs in his home district and profits for companies that are donors to his political causes".
The Lexington Herald-Leader in 2005 called Rogers the "Prince of Pork". The Times article reported that Rogers had inserted language ("existing government card issuance centers") into appropriations bills that effectively pushed the federal government into testingat a cost of $4millionolder, inappropriate technology for a new fraud-resistant green card for permanent legal immigrants, at a production plant in Corbin, Kentucky, within Rogers's district. The study concluded that the smart card approach was far superior. The New York Times found that Rogers had received about $100,000 in contributions from parties with at least some ties to the identification card effort.

In response to these critics, Rogers said, "It should surprise no one that this article from Rolling Stone regarding my activity in connection with the Transportation Worker Identity Card (TWIC) is grossly incorrect, and highly slanderous ... A true and honest analysis would reveal that my sole interest in TWIC is simply to protect America's seaports, airports, and other transportation facilities from terrorist penetration. To purport that my actions have compromised national security in an effort to bring jobs to Kentucky or for personal gain is an absolute lie."

After Iran objected to the interim deployment of an Afloat Forward Staging Base to counter their threats to close the Persian Gulf, Rogers cut the funding for the project.

Rogers faced some criticism after he reportedly poked his colleague and Congressional Black Caucus Chair Joyce Beatty in the back and told her to "kiss my ass" after she asked him to put on a mask, as required on the United States Capitol subway system where the incident occurred. Rogers soon issued an apology to Beatty.

MilCon/VA Bill

On June 12, 2013, the White House threatened to veto the MilCon/VA spending bill because Republicans did not agree with the Senate's number of $1.058trillion intended for military operations and research, after the MilCon/VA bill received 421 bipartisan votes in House. "We're marking up to $967billion, the top line under current law," said Rogers, as chairman of United States House Committee on Appropriations.

Legislation

On January 15, 2013, Rogers introduced H.R. 298, officially titled "To direct the Secretary of the Interior to conduct a special resource study to evaluate the significance of the Mill Springs Battlefield located in Pulaski and Wayne Counties, Kentucky, and the feasibility of its inclusion in the National Park System, and for other purposes". The bill would direct the Secretary of the Interior to conduct a special resource study to evaluate the significance of the Mill Springs Battlefield in Kentucky (relating to the Battle of Mill Springs fought on January 19, 1862, in Pulaski and Wayne Counties during the Civil War) and the feasibility of its inclusion in the National Park System (NPS). Rogers said, "the Battle of Mill Springs is a source of great pride and interest to the people I serve." Rogers argued that the Battlefield was a "jewel" and would be "an excellent addition to the National Park Service".

On March 5, 2014, Rogers introduced the To provide for the costs of loan guarantees for Ukraine (H.R. 4152; 113th Congress) into the House. The bill would provide loan guarantees to Ukraine of up to $1billion, part of the American response to the 2014 Russian military intervention in Ukraine. The bill passed in the House on March 6, 2014.

In 2014 Rogers's committee called for cuts in the National Nuclear Security Administration budget that cast doubt on the Navy's ability to provide an Ohio Replacement Submarine class.

On July 29, 2014, Rogers introduced the Making supplemental appropriations for the fiscal year ending September 30, 2014 (H.R. 5230; 113th Congress), a bill that would provide supplemental FY2014 appropriations to several federal agencies for expenses related to the rise in unaccompanied alien children and alien adults accompanied by an alien minor at the southwest border. The bill would also change the procedures for screening and processing unaccompanied alien children who arrive at the border from certain countries. The bill would provide $659million in supplemental funding. Rogers urged members to pass the bill, arguing that "more and more immigrants will continue to flood across the border if you fail to act" because resources were running out.

Committee assignments

Committee on Appropriations
Subcommittee on State and Foreign Operations (ranking member)
Subcommittee on Defense

Caucus memberships

Congressional Coal Caucus
Congressional Prescription Drug Abuse Caucus (co-chair)
United States Congressional International Conservation Caucus
Sportsmen's Caucus
Tennessee Valley Authority Caucus
House Republican Steering Committee

Political positions

Budget and economy
Rogers is in favor of dismantling the Home Affordable Modification Program. He opposed the GM and Chrysler bailout in 2009. He opposes regulating the subprime mortgage industry. He supports a balanced budget amendment.

Domestic issues

Gun control

In 2018, Rogers co-sponsored a bill to "strengthen school safety and security", which required a two-thirds vote for passage, given it was brought up under an expedited process. The House voted 407-10 to approve the bill, which would "provide $50million a year for a new federal grant program to train students, teachers and law enforcement on how to spot and report signs of gun violence". Named STOP (Students, Teachers, and Officers Preventing) School Violence Act, it would "develop anonymous telephone and online systems where people could report threats of violence". At the same time, it would authorize $25 million for schools to improve and harden their security, such as installing new locks, lights, metal detectors and panic buttons. A separate spending bill would be required to provide money for the grant program.

Crime

Rogers supports expanding the juvenile justice system, including renovating and hiring additional prosecutors. Rogers supports the death penalty.

Environment

Rogers has a 13 percent rating from the Humane Society for his anti-animal welfare voting record.

Technology

Rogers is in favor of ending federal funding for National Public Radio. He opposes net neutrality.

International issues

Immigration

Rogers supports efforts to make the English language the official language of the US. He supports building a fence along the Mexico-US border.

Russian interference

In July 2018, while serving temporarily as chair of the House Rules committee, Rogers rejected requests to increase federal funding for election security. The U.S. intelligence community had concluded that Russia interfered in the 2016 election and that it was continuing to interfere in election systems as of July 2018.

Social issues

Abortion

Rogers is anti-abortion. He has a 100 percent rating from the National Right to Life Committee and a zero percent rating from NARAL Pro-Choice America for his abortion-related voting record. He is in favor of banning federal funding from supporting organizations that provide abortions, as well as federal health insurance covering abortions, unless the pregnancy is the result of rape, incest, or threatens the mother's life. He opposes embryonic stem cell research. He opposes human cloning.

Cannabis

Rogers has a "D" rating from NORML for his voting history regarding cannabis-related causes. Rogers opposes veterans having access to medical marijuana if recommended by their Veterans Health Administration doctor and if it is legal for medicinal purposes in their state of residence.

Civil rights

Rogers has a 28 percent rating from the NAACP for his civil rights voting record. He opposes affirmative action.

LGBT, families and children

Rogers has a 92 percent rating from the Christian Coalition for his socially conservative voting record. He has a zero percent rating from the Human Rights Campaign regarding his voting record on LGBT rights. Rogers opposes same-sex marriage. He opposes prohibiting job discrimination based on sexual orientation. He opposes single people and same-sex couples being allowed to adopt children. Rogers opposes classifying crimes motivated by the victim's sexual orientation as hate crimes.

Personal life

Rogers had three children with his first wife, Shirley Rogers. She died of cancer in 1995. Rogers remarried. His wife is named Cynthia.

Electoral history

|+ : Results 1980–2022
! Year
!
! Republican
! Votes
! %
!
! Democratic
! Votes
! %
!
! Third Party
! Party
! Votes
! %
|-
|1980
||
| |Hal Rogers
| |112,093
| |67%
|
| |Ted Marcum
| |54,027
| |33%
|
|
|
|
|
|-
|1982
||
| |Hal Rogers
| |52,928
| |65%
|
| |Doye Davenport
| |28,285
| |35%
|
|
|
|
|
|-
|1984
||
| |Hal Rogers
| |125,164
| |76%
|
| |Sherman McIntosh
| |39,783
| |24%
|
|
|
|
|
|-
|1986
||
| |Hal Rogers
| |56,760
| |100%
|
| |No candidate
| |
| |
|
|
|
|
|
|-
|1988
||
| |Hal Rogers
| |104,467
| |100%
|
| |No candidate
| |
| |
|
|
|
|
|
|-
|1990
||
| |Hal Rogers
| |64,660
| |100%
|
| |No candidate
| |
| |
|
|
|
|
|
|-
|1992
||
| |Hal Rogers
| |115,255
| |55%
|
| |John Hays
| |95,760
| |45%
|
|
|
|
|
|-
|1994
||
| |Hal Rogers
| |82,291
| |79%
|
| |Walter Blevins
| |21,318
| |21%
|
|
|
|
|
|-
|1996
||
| |Hal Rogers
| |117,842
| |100%
|
| |No candidate
| |
| |
|
|
|
|
|
|-
|1998
||
| |Hal Rogers
| |142,215
| |78%
|
| |Sidney Jane Bailey
| |39,585
| |22%
|
|
|
|
|
|-
|2000
||
| |Hal Rogers
| |145,980
| |74%
|
| |Sidney Jane Bailey
| |52,495
| |26%
|
|
|
|
|
|-
|2002
||
| |Hal Rogers
| |137,986
| |78%
|
| |Sidney Jane Bailey
| |38,254
| |22%
|
|
|
|
|
|-
|2004
||
| |Hal Rogers
| |177,579
| |100%
|
| |No candidate
| |
| |
|
|
|
|
|
|-
|2006
||
| |Hal Rogers
| |147,201
| |74%
|
| |Kenneth Stepp
| |52,367
| |26%
|
|
|
|
|
|-
|2008
||
| |Hal Rogers
| |177,024
| |84%
|
| |No candidate
| |
| |
|
| |Jim Holbert
| |Independent
| |33,444
| |16%
|-
|2010
||
| |Hal Rogers
| |151,019
| |77%
|
| |Jim Holbert
| |44,034
| |23%
|
|
|
|
|
|-
|2012
||
| |Hal Rogers
| |195,408
| |78%
|
| |Kenneth Stepp
| |55,447
| |22%
|
|
|
|
|
|-
|2014
||
| |Hal Rogers
| |171,350
| |78%
|
| |Kenneth Stepp
| |47,617
| |22%
|
|
|
|
|
|-
|2016
||
| |Hal Rogers
| |221,242
| |100%
|
| |No candidate
| |
| |
|
|
|
|
|
|-
|2018
||
| |Hal Rogers
| |172,093	
| |78%
|
| |Kenneth Stepp
| |45,890	
| |21%
|
| |Billy Ray Wilson
| |Independent
| |34
| |1%
|-
|2020
||
| |Hal Rogers
| |250,914	
| |84%
|
| |Matthew Best
| |47,056	
| |16%
|
|
|
|
|
|-
|2022
||
| |Hal Rogers
| |177,714	
| |82%
|
| |Conor Halbleib
| |38,549	
| |18%
|
|
|
|
|
|-

References

External links

Congressman Hal Rogers official U.S. House website

Biography at Our States: Kentucky, 2007

|-

|-

|-

|-

|-

|-

1937 births
21st-century American politicians
American prosecutors
Baptists from Kentucky
Baptists from the United States
Kentucky Commonwealth's Attorneys
Kentucky lawyers
Living people
People from Somerset, Kentucky
People from Wayne County, Kentucky
Republican Party members of the United States House of Representatives from Kentucky
United States Army soldiers